ITO may refer to:

 Hilo International Airport, IATA airport code
 Indium tin oxide, a transparent conductor
 Information Technology Outsourcing
 International Trade Organization
 Inventory turnover, a measure of the number of times inventory is sold or used in a certain period of time
 Involuntary Treatment Order, typically for psychiatric treatment
 Initial token offering

See also 
 Ito (disambiguation)
 ITO barrage, on the Yamuna River, India